Salvador Ardil Navarro (born 17 April 1988), better known as Chiky Ardil, is a Spanish beach soccer player who plays as a forward. He has appeared at two editions of the FIFA Beach Soccer World Cup (2015 and 2021) representing the Spain national team; at the European qualifying tournament for the latter, he won the MVP award. His younger brother, David, also plays for Spain.

Career
Salvador believes his nickname "Chiky" originates from when he was a toddler, and considerably smaller than his three other siblings. "Chiky" is a truncating of the Spanish word "chiquitín", meaning tiny.

He began playing futsal aged five before quickly switching to association football under the wing of his older brother, Raúl. Chiky ultimately established himself as a footballer in the third tier of Spanish football, having spells at multiple clubs including Lorca Deportiva, CD Bala Azul, Granada 74, Rayo Majadahonda, Pinatar CF and Águilas CF.

Chiky eventually accepted an invite from friends to partake in a beach soccer tournament in his hometown of Mazarrón. Having enjoyed it, Chiky and his team began taking part regularly in tournaments in Murcia, Alicante and Valencia. In 2013, after a tournament in Andalusia, he was called up to the Murcian regional team. His first tournament with the team was a success, in which he scored 18 goals; Spain coach Joaquín Alonso was impressed and called Chiky up to the national team. Chiky debuted for Spain at stage 5 of the 2013 Euro Beach Soccer League in Moscow, however he was ultimately not selected for the 2013 World Cup later that year. In 2014, Chiky was called back to the national team following a runners-up finish with Bala Azul in the Spanish National Beach Soccer League. After qualifying for the 2015 World Cup, Chiky received a special reception by the Mayor of Mazarrón at the town hall.

Since 2017, Chiky has found himself amongst the awards: his overhead kick against Greece during the 2017 Euro Beach Soccer League was nominated for best goal of the year, whilst he claimed his first individual international award in 2018 when he was top scorer at the Nazaré stage of the 2018 Euro Beach Soccer League; he was nominated for best beach soccer goal of the year again in 2019. In 2021 he was deemed MVP of the UEFA qualifiers for the FIFA World Cup, something he called "a landmark moment" in his career. He was subsequently received by the Mayor of Mazarrón again before leaving to play for Spain at the 2021 World Cup; at said tournament, he was Spain's top scorer with six goals.

He continues to play football in the Spanish third tier, for Mazarrón FC. He claims he has had to make "a lot of sacrifice[s]" in order to be able to play both sports, including performing double training sessions, one for each sport. He claims he will give up football to focus on beach soccer when Mazarrón FC no longer want his service.

Statistics

Country

Club

Honours
The following is a selection, not an exhaustive list, of the major honours Chiky has achieved with Spain:

Team
UEFA qualifiers for the FIFA Beach Soccer World Cup
Winner (1): 2021
Intercontinental Cup
Runner-up (1): 2019
Euro Beach Soccer League
Runner-up (2): 2014, 2018
European Games:
Silver medal (1): 2019
Euro Beach Soccer Cup:
Winner (1): 2014

Individual
CONMEBOL qualifiers for the FIFA Beach Soccer World Cup (1):
Best player: 2021
Euro Beach Soccer League (1):
Regular season stages:
Top scorer: 2018(1)
Top scorer:intercontinental cup Dubai 2021
Mvp :Mundialito gran canarias
Beach Soccer Stars 
Top 10 best goals of the year (2): 2017, 2019

References

External links
Salvador Ardil Navarro, profile at Beach Soccer Worldwide

1988 births
Living people
Spanish footballers
Spanish beach soccer players
Association football forwards
European Games silver medalists for Spain
European Games medalists in beach soccer
Beach soccer players at the 2015 European Games
Beach soccer players at the 2019 European Games
People from Mazarrón
Sportspeople from the Region of Murcia